The Transportation Expansion (T-REX) Project was a $1.67 billion project with the goal of transforming the way people in the Denver metro area commute within the areas of Interstate 25 and 225, the country's 14th busiest intersection at the time. The T-REX effort widened major interstates to as much as 7 lanes wide in each direction and added  of double-track light rail throughout the metropolitan area ( total). Some consider it to be one of the most successful transportation upgrade projects in the United States. It also received a National Design-Build Award from the Design-Build Institute of America. The T-REX project finished 3.2% under its $1.67 billion budget and 22 months ahead of schedule in 2006 and is considered to be an example of inter-governmental agency cooperation for transportation projects for North America and Worldwide and national and international stakeholders have been recognized nationally for its success, including quality management. 

Success in T-REX led to public support of FasTracks during the 2004 election.

The T-REX corridor carries more than 280,000 vehicles per day and connects the two largest employment centers in the region: Downtown Denver and the Denver Tech Center.

Funding
T-REX was funded using no new state, county, city, or gas taxes. This was partially due to the TABOR laws enacted in 1992, and the State Leadership's stance against levying additional taxes on its constituents. Instead, metropolitan areas that would benefit from the expansion voted to approve an increase of property taxes required for the build out. In November 1999, voters in affected municipalities approved two property-tax increases which partially funded the transit portion of the project.

Among those:
 Design-build contract with Southeast Corridor Constructors worth $1.18 billion.
 Light rail costs: $879 million, with $437 million coming from RTD and local matching funds; $525 million from an FTA full-funding grant agreement.
 Highway costs: $795 million, from highway users taxes and matching federal revenue.
 34 new light-rail vehicles: $91.8 million.
 Elati Street Light Rail Maintenance Facility: $39.5 million.

History

T-REX's initial footsteps can be traced back to a 1992 traffic congestion study commissioned by the Denver Regional Council of Governments (DRCOG). The study found that traffic volume along the corridor had exceeded its maximum capacity of 180,000 vehicles per day and, within a few years, the freeway would be near gridlock most of the day. Adding to the gloomy forecast of gridlock, planners projected that 150,000 new jobs would be added in the downtown area and at the huge Denver Tech Center, which is 15 miles (24 kilometers) to the south, over the next 20 years. The study not only recommended widening the freeway by several lanes, but it also suggested incorporating some type of mass transit into any future improvements.

In April 1995, The Colorado Department of Transportation and RTD took the first step toward developing the partnership that ultimately became T-REX. The two agencies and DRCOG commissioned the Southeast Corridor Major Investment Study (MIS), which sought the best solutions to the I-25/I-225 congestion problem. Arapahoe and Douglas counties along with the cities of Denver, Aurora, and Greenwood Village participated in the initial MIS. Two other Denver-area corridor studies were also undertaken.

The initial MIS was primarily transit-oriented in scope. The recommendations included light rail, highway improvements, pedestrian/bicycle facility improvements, enhanced Transportation Demand Management (TDM), Intelligent transportation system (ITS) measures. It also recommended safety improvements such as acceleration and deceleration lanes, wider shoulders. The initial MIS did not call for additional highway lanes. The Federal Highway Administration and CDOT were troubled by this omission, and leaders of all four agencies agreed that the MIS placed too much emphasis on transit.

"We weren't going to spend over a billion dollars on this project without involving more highway capacity. It couldn't be a predominantly transit project," Said Bill Jones, the Federal Highway Administration's Colorado Division administrator. "This was the turning point when we realized together that the transit part of the project couldn't be built without the highway part."

"We looked at ways to break down the highway vs. transit rivalry and started looking at mobility," RTD Director, Cal Marsella said. "Let's look at highway and transit as coordinated pieces of a comprehensive strategy to maximize mobility in a project with limited available right of way. We set our sights on a project that was a win-win (proposition) for both transit and highway. What emerged was the T-REX project."

A second, more comprehensive MIS was completed two years later. Unlike the initial study, the scope included Core Infrastructure (Highway) improvements as well as Transit solutions. It recommended expanding highway lanes up to 7 wide in each direction as well as added light rail support throughout the corridor. Additionally, the cities of Lone Tree, Parker and Centennial were also included for input and feedback.

In November 1998, DRCOG adopted a 20-year regional transportation plan called Metro Vision 2020. T-REX was a top priority in the plan.

Planning for the project began in June 1999, with the passage of a law allowing the state Department of Transportation (CDOT) to use Transportation Revenue Anticipation Notes to borrow money based on federal funds the state had not yet approved. Shortly thereafter, The Colorado Department of Transportation (CDOT), Regional Transportation District (RTD), Federal Highway Administration and Federal Transit Administration signed a "Partnering Agreement" to work on the project, and voters approved the plan to run light rail through the corridor. Southeast Corridor Constructors, a joint venture between Omaha, Nebraska-based Kiewit Construction and Pasadena, CA-based Parsons Transportation Group  won the design-build contract in May 2001. Construction began only a few months later- in June 2001.

The "Partnering Agreement" was a key to the success of the project. Signed by all stakeholders, and it established four primary goals:
 Minimize inconvenience to the community, motorists, and public.
 Meet or beat the total program budget of $1.67 billion.
 Provide a quality project.
 Meet or beat the project's operational deadline of June 30, 2008.

Another vitally important element of the MIS process and success to the project was the early formation of two committees—A Policy Committee provided input on policy-related issues and monitored project progress relative to the overall public agency decision-making process, and a Technical Committee focused on all planning, engineering and environmental issues and assisted in the development and refinement of alternatives. Members of this committee were individuals from the various cities and jurisdictions within the study area who had a technical background.

These two committees, (Policy Committee and Technical Committee) used goals from the "Partnering Agreement" to refine and evaluate each alternative. Public meetings and numerous workshops were held during NEPA (National Environmental Policy Act) scoping and at key milestones during the study to present the definition of alternatives and to guide the Colorado Department of Transportation and RTD in the development and evaluation of any Preferred Alternatives. Committee members primarily consisted of elected and/or appointed policy/decision-making officials from the affected areas. After the adoption of the MIS, all four agencies in June 1998 signed a "partnering charter" that created a leadership team to identify and pursue the best multi modal solutions.

CDOT and RTD next assembled the teams into one location. Top management from all four agencies began meeting every two weeks. The purpose of the senior-level meetings was "not just to get briefings," said Chick Dolby, Federal Transit Administration deputy regional administrator, "but to do the planning and make decisions."

A project newsletter was published at key project milestones to keep the public informed. The committees remained intact during the NEPA and preliminary engineering process, and monthly meetings were held to keep them involved. This also helped with maintaining a constant public process and ongoing relations with the public through the release of project newsletters, which discussed the project, listed milestone dates and invited the public to attend open houses and provide comments. Press releases and a media tour were utilized to keep the project in the media, and project displays were placed in public buildings to keep the public informed. A project website was continuously updated with the latest documents and information. Project team members met over 215 times with community groups.

By the end of 2002, working with a $100 million budget, the T-REX Project acquired six single-family homes, two duplexes and two apartment buildings. It negotiated 30 total acquisitions and 172 partial acquisitions. Businesses were also eligible for replacement property costs and moving costs. As with residential properties, the T-REX Project purchased business properties, and relocation experts helped businesses move. No one had to move until they found comparable replacement housing.

T-REX's five-year design-build project added  of light rail and improved  of highway through southeast Denver, Aurora, Greenwood Village, Centennial and Lone Tree. The unprecedented project is the result of a unique collaboration between the Colorado Department of Transportation, the Regional Transportation District, which is responsible for transit service in the metro Denver area, the Federal Highway Administration and the Federal Transit Administration. Construction began in Fall 2001 and construction ended in December 2006, 22 months ahead of the original schedule. Additionally, light rail service along the Southeast Corridor began in late 2006.

Timeline
 April 1995 — Southeast Corridor Major Investment Study (MIS) begins. Recommends 19-mile (31-kilometer), 13-station light-rail extension and major safety improvements (but no additional lanes) to I-25/I-225.
 October 1997 — Denver Regional Council of Governments adopts MIS.
 March 1998 — Public meetings begin for project's environmental impact statement (EIS).
 November 1999 — Voters approve two bond measures that pave the way for project financing.
 December 1999 — Final EIS signed.
 March 2000 — Record of decision issued.
 July 2000 —T-REX begins qualifying contractors for bidding.
 November 2000 —FTA awards $525 million full-funding agreement. Request for proposal released to qualified bidders.
 May 2001 — Southeast Corridor Project renamed Transportation Expansion Project (T-REX). Southeast Corridor Constructors, a Kiewit-Parsons team, selected to build the project.
 June 2001 — Contract awarded; notice to proceed issued.
 September 24, 2001 — Groundbreaking.
 October 2001 — Construction begins.
 March 27, 2004 — Bridges at I-225 and I-25 demolished after unsuccessful implosion attempt.
 April 2006 — RTD Began advertising the T-Rex project on its website which announced the opening day.
 July 2006 — Station signs added.
 October 2006 — RTD offered discounted fairs during the first week of the opening day.
 November 17, 2006 — Completed and opened.

Need more details... Please add

Novel Approach in "Design Build" Methodology
T-REX is one of the first transportation projects in the US to use a design-build contract in which the same contractor is responsible for the project's engineering and construction. Under this type of contract, the contracting agency provides a general concept of the plan, and the contractor is responsible for most of the details, many of which are worked out as the project proceeds. "This project represents the first time, in any state, that a state transportation department and a transit agency have come together to build one project under a single financial plan, to provide travelers with integrated transportation system options." said Randy Pierce, who served as consultant principal-in-charge/project manager of T-REX. "We think, based on our research, that it's the largest transportation design-build project in the country," says Richard Clarke, T-REX project director. "We were able to get it done a lot faster because we finished a lot of the construction before the design was completely done."

Because the T-REX is unique by combining light rail, highway, bike, pedestrian and other transit options, the project used a multi-modal approach to address some of the traffic problems.

Success Metrics
Design-build allowed for flexibility and creativity in support of the project goals, which were in line with the original "Partnering Agreement":

 Minimize inconvenience to the public (meant working during off hours of between 9pm and 5am)
 Stay within the project's $1.67 billion budget
 Design and construct a quality project
 Complete the project on or before June 2008* (actual end date was December 2006, 22 months early)

The public was generally in favor of the project. There was, however, some opposition from property owners who opposed the outright taking of, or encroachment onto their property, but relocation experts helped residents and businesses move. No one had to move until they found comparable replacement housing. Public input did result in minor changes to the project, including light rail alignment and station locations. Political support may also have been a factor in the expediting of the project. Colorado Governor Roy Romer supported the project from the outset, and there was local political support for light rail. However, some local politicians and special interest groups were against the highway.

Financial Benefits

Quality of Life Benefits
 I-25 links Denver's two major employment centers downtown and the Denver Tech Center where more than 200,000 people work.
 Regional growth will add another 150,000 jobs in DTC and downtown over the next 20 years, says the Denver Regional Council of Governments, a multi-county oversight group.
 Denver Mayor John Hickenlooper, and former Gov. Bill Owens understand that the new infrastructure, and decreased commute times throughout the metro area are a plus and increase quality of life. They have actively pursued A "Mission of Economic Development", talking to companies who might be looking to relocate.

Infrastructure Benefits

 One additional lane in each direction on most sections; two additional lanes in most congested areas.
 Reconstructed eight interchanges, most notably the I-25/I-225 interchange, which was ranked the 14th most congested interchange in the nation.
 Complete reconstruction of "Narrows" (Broadway to Steele streets).
 Replacement or rehabilitation of 18 bridges.
 Acceleration and deceleration lanes throughout.
 Shoulders widened where feasible.
 Implementation of Transportation Demand Management (TDM) solutions which assist on-ramp timing.
 Intelligent Transportation Systems (ITS) which allowed ExpressToll, a form of electronic toll collection, to collect toll for single-person capacity usage while in the HOV lanes, a need identified by some HOV offenders.
 Major drainage upgrades.
 Added  of double-track light rail connecting to the existing system at Broadway in Denver and extending along the west side of I-25 to Lincoln Avenue in Douglas County and in the median of I-225 from I-25 to Parker Road in Aurora.
 13 stations with Bus Transit available at 12 of the stations.
 34 additional light rail vehicles were added to RTD's fleet.
 Construction of a new light rail maintenance facility in Englewood.

On Interstate 25 Additional benefits to roadways were:
 Add one through lane in each direction from Logan Street to I-225 (for a total of four lanes each way).
 Add two through lanes in each direction from I-225 to the C470/E470 interchange (for a total of five lanes each way).

On Interstate 225 T-REX's Benefits were:
 Addition of one through lane in each direction from Parker Road in Aurora to I-25 (for a total of three lanes each way).
 Reconstructed and widened numerous bridges.
 Improved drainage.
 Enhanced safety.
 Add and improve shoulders.
 Improve ramps and acceleration/deceleration lanes.

Model for other cities

 Utah was the first state to employ design-build on a very large transportation project. It served as a model for T-REX. UDOT and the Utah Transit Authority worked to reconstruct a major Salt Lake City arterial, Interstate 15, and construction had to be finished for the 2002 Winter Olympics. This project required collaboration between UDOT and the Utah Transit Authority (UTA) because it combined a light-rail project with the roadwork, said Doug Dansie, principal planner for the Salt Lake City Planning Department. "The rail lines were built because just expanding the freeway wasn't enough to handle the commuter capacity," Dansie says. Utah's rail line solution, unlike T-REX, were not in the interstates right-of-way. Dansie believes projects like T-REX that combine traffic and highway expansion are probably the best approach to relieving congestion, though there is currently a bias toward road expansion. "It really does need to be a balance," Doug Dansie, principal planner for the Salt Lake City Planning Department said.
 Representatives from the Arizona Department of Transportation, the Maricopa Association of Governments and the Valley Metro Rail system in Phoenix observed T-REX. Phoenix is in the early stages of a similar project on its Interstate 10 corridor, one that also involves expanding the highway and building more rail lines, says Wulf Grote, director of project development for Valley Metro Rail. "We hoped the trip to Denver would spark some discussion on working together," Grote says. While Phoenix's light-rail project will not be complete until around 2019, the highway improvements are supposed to be finished in the next five years. Like T-Rex, Valley Metro wants to run its rail lines in the highway's right-of-way.
 Wisconsin Department of Transportation has considered implementing design-build strategies into future projects.

Argument for Light rail instead of HOV lanes

Light rail transit was endorsed because of the following reasons noted in the T-REX factbook:

 Light rail has significantly less impact to existing residences and businesses in the corridor and to natural resources, such as wetlands, parks, and historic properties.
 Light rail has the greatest potential carrying capacity.
 Light rail has the best travel time.
 Light rail requires the lowest investment per user.
 Light rail had stronger potential for joint development.
 Light rail is the most reliable and safe option.
 Light rail had stronger community support.

Additionally, Denver Mayor John Hickenlooper said, "Light rail offers a good solution to congestion, because even if you add more highway lanes, they quickly are filled with more cars." "You can add more and more traffic to the rail line, and not only does it not slow down, it takes more people," Mayor Hickenlooper continued, "Combining rail lines with highway expansion has a lot of appeal to voters, but the ability to do so depends on the amount of space available for the project."

See also
Colorado Department of Transportation
Denver Regional Council of Governments
light rail
mass transit
state highways in Colorado
State of Colorado

References

External links
http://www.irfnews.org/trex_press_release.htm
http://www.orcharddevelopmentgroup.com/news_denverpost_101706.htm
http://www.environment.fhwa.dot.gov/strmlng/casestudies/co.asp 
http://ops.fhwa.dot.gov/congestion_report_04/chapter4.htm
http://www.tfhrc.gov/pubrds/septoct01/trex.htm
http://www.lsgallegos.com/featured_project_trans_support.htm
http://www.constructor.construction.com/coverStories/default.asp
http://www.transportation1.org/tif1report/expansion.html
http://www.lightrailnow.org/news/n_lrt_2007-03a.htm
http://americancityandcounty.com/features/government_parallel_tracks/
https://web.archive.org/web/20040806063348/http://www.trexproject.com/trex_channels/about/factbook.asp
https://web.archive.org/web/20040806064107/http://www.trexproject.com/trex_channels/about/introduction.asp
http://www.denvergov.org/CouncilDistrict7/tabid/425111/Default.aspx
https://web.archive.org/web/20040806063348/http://www.trexproject.com/trex_content/about/trex_2003_factbook.pdf

Regional Transportation District
T_REX Project
Urban planning in the United States
Road transportation in the United States
Transport economics
Transportation planning